Johnston Birchall (1951–2021) was a leading British academic in the field of co-operative studies and at the time of his death Professor Emeritus at the Social Science Faculty of the University of Stirling.

Biography 
Birchall studied theology at the University of Oxford, before working as a community worker and a housing association manager for five years. He then completed a masters degree in sociology at the University of York, followed by a PhD in 1985 on housing co-operatives, also at York. His doctoral thesis formed the basis for his 1988 book, Building Communities: The Co-operative Way. 

Birchall then worked at South Bank Polytechnic, followed by Brunel University and finally at the University of Stirling until his retirement. From 1995 to 2000 he was editor of the Journal of Co-operative Studies.

Birchall died in 2021 following a long illness. In June 2022 a special commemorative edition of the Journal of Co-operative Studies was published exploring Birchall's legacy and reprinting many of his papers.

Publications

Further reading

References 

1951 births
2021 deaths
British cooperative organizers
British social scientists
Alumni of the University of York
Alumni of the University of Oxford
Academics of the University of Stirling
Academics of Brunel University London